Michael George van der Spuy (born 20 February 1991) is a South African former rugby union player who played Super Rugby with the  and the , and Currie Cup rugby with ,  and the . His regular position was centre. He retired in 2017 on medical advice.

Career

Youth

Western Province

That was his only Currie Cup appearance in 2011, reverting to the U21 squad for the remainder of the season.

The following season, he made eight appearances in the 2012 Vodacom Cup competition, scoring one try. Injuries restricted his playing time in the Currie Cup season, however.

Another eight appearances (and three tries) followed in the 2013 Vodacom Cup and he was included in the 2013 Currie Cup Premier Division squad.

Griquas

Van der Spuy joined Kimberley-based side  before the 2015 season.

Free State Cheetahs

Van der Spuy signed a contract to join Bloemfontein-based side  before the 2016 season on a two-year contract.

References

South African rugby union players
Living people
1991 births
People from Bethlehem, Free State
Western Province (rugby union) players
Stormers players
Rugby union centres
Alumni of Grey College, Bloemfontein
Rugby union players from the Free State (province)